Michael Joseph McCormick (October 22, 1882 – November 18, 1953), was a Scottish born professional baseball third baseman. He played one season in Major League Baseball for the 1904 Brooklyn Superbas.  He is also known as "Mike McCormack" in some references.

External links

Major League Baseball third basemen
Major League Baseball players from the United Kingdom
Major League Baseball players from Scotland
Scottish baseball players
Brooklyn Superbas players
Waterbury Rough Riders players
Holyoke Paperweights players
Nashville Vols players
St. Paul Saints (AA) players
Toledo Mud Hens players
Portland Beavers players
Baseball players from Jersey City, New Jersey
1880s births
1953 deaths